The Bowland High Group is a lithostratigraphical term referring to the thick succession of limestone rock strata which occur in the Craven Basin of Lancashire and Yorkshire in northern England,  United Kingdom from the Courceyan to the Chadian sub-Stage of the Carboniferous Period.

The Bowland High Group is unconformably overlain by the Hodder Mudstone Formation of the Craven Group.

References

See also
Geology of Lancashire

Carboniferous System of Europe
Stratigraphy of the United Kingdom